Friederichsen Glacier is a glacier  long, which flows in an easterly direction into Cabinet Inlet, close north of Mount Hulth, on the east coast of Graham Land, Antarctica. It was charted by the Falkland Islands Dependencies Survey (FIDS) and photographed from the air by the Ronne Antarctic Research Expedition in 1947. It was named by the FIDS for Ludwig Friederichsen, a German cartographer who in 1895 published a chart based upon all existing explorations of the Antarctic Peninsula and the South Shetland Islands.

References

Glaciers of Graham Land
Foyn Coast